Milan Srećo (born 30 January 1984) is a Serbian professional footballer who plays as a midfielder for Austrian club SK Bischofshofen.

Career
Srećo came through the youth system of Partizan. He made one league appearance for the first team in the last fixture of the 2004–05 season, as the club won the title. During his time at Partizan, Srećo was also loaned out to Radnički Klupci, Borac Banja Luka, Teleoptik, and Slavija Sarajevo.

After leaving Partizan, Srećo represented numerous clubs such as Grbalj, Mladenovac, Zemun, Banat Zrenjanin, and Kozara Gradiška. He also played for Borac Banja Luka in the 2010–11 season, winning the national championship in his second spell at the club.

In early 2012, Srećo moved to Austria and joined TSV St. Johann. He made over 200 appearances for the club in the Austrian Regionalliga over the course of 10 seasons.

Career statistics

Honours
Partizan
 First League of Serbia and Montenegro: 2004–05
Borac Banja Luka
 Premier League of Bosnia and Herzegovina: 2010–11

References

External links
 

Association football midfielders
Expatriate footballers in Austria
Expatriate footballers in Montenegro
First League of Serbia and Montenegro players
FK Banat Zrenjanin players
FK Borac Banja Luka players
FK Kozara Gradiška players
FK Partizan players
FK Radnički Klupci players
FK Slavija Sarajevo players
FK Teleoptik players
FK Zemun players
Montenegrin First League players
OFK Grbalj players
OFK Mladenovac players
Premier League of Bosnia and Herzegovina players
Serbian expatriate footballers
Serbian expatriate sportspeople in Austria
Serbian expatriate sportspeople in Montenegro
Serbian First League players
Serbian footballers
Serbian SuperLiga players
Serbs of Bosnia and Herzegovina
Sportspeople from Banja Luka
1984 births
Living people